The 1955–56 Iraq FA Baghdad First Division was the eighth season of the Iraq Central FA League (the top division of football in Baghdad and its neighbouring cities from 1948 to 1973). Al-Haras Al-Malaki won their seventh consecutive league title. The team was disbanded at the end of the season.

References

External links
 Iraqi Football Website

Iraq Central FA League seasons
Iraq
1955 in Iraqi sport
1956 in Iraqi sport